The following are the football (soccer) events of the year 1961 throughout the world.

Events
Copa Libertadores 1961: Won by Peñarol after defeating Palmeiras on an aggregate score of 2–1.
1961 International Soccer League
FK Dukla Prague beat Everton F.C., 9–2, in the final on aggregate
September 6 – Dutch club Feyenoord from Rotterdam makes its European debut by defeating Sweden's IFK Göteborg (0–3) in the first round of the European Cup.
September 18 – The North American Football Confederation and Football Confederation of Central America and the Caribbean merge to form CONCACAF.

Winners club national championship
 : Racing Club
 : Santos
 : Tottenham Hotspur
 : AS Monaco
 : KR
 : Juventus
 : Chivas Guadalajara
 : Feyenoord
 : Cerro Porteño
 : Steaua București
 : FC Dynamo Kyiv
 : Real Madrid
 : Fenerbahçe

International tournaments
1961 British Home Championship (October 8, 1960 – April 15, 1961)

Births

 January 12 – Andrea Carnevale, Italian international footballer
 January 13 – César Baena, Venezuelan international footballer
 January 17 – Zhao Dayu, Chinese international footballer (died 2015)
 January 18 – Peter Beardsley, English international footballer
 January 20 – Patricio Yáñez, Chilean international footballer
 January 31 – Jonny Otten, German international footballer
 February 13 – Oļegs Karavajevs, Latvian international footballer
 March 13 – Sebastiano Nela, Italian international footballer
 March 21 – Lothar Matthäus, German international footballer and manager
 April 11 – Roberto Cabañas, Paraguayan international footballer (died 2017)
 May 3 – Daniel Sánchez, Uruguayan international footballer
 May 5 – Ali Hussein Shihab, Iraqi international footballer (died 2016)
 May 8 – Gert Kruys, Dutch footballer and manager
 May 21 – Thomas Dooley, American international footballer and manager
 June 1 – Rubén Espinoza, Chilean footballer
 June 3 – César Zabala, Paraguayan international footballer (died 2020) 
 June 29 – Víctor Genés, Paraguayan footballer and football manager (died 2019)
 August 1 – Danny Blind, Dutch international footballer and manager
 August 10 – Chris Marustik, Welsh international footballer (died 2015)
 September 9 – Justo Jacquet, Paraguayan footballer
 September 20 – Erwin Koeman, Dutch international footballer and manager
 October 16 – Wilfried Brookhuis, Dutch footballer
 October 20 – Guillermo Muñoz, Mexican footballer
 November 3 – Sven Habermann, German-Canadian footballer
 November 4 – Nigel Worthington, Northern Irish international footballer and manager
 November 17 – Wolfram Wuttke, German international footballer (died 2015)
 November 20 – Dave Watson, English footballer and manager
 December 17 – Henk van Stee, Dutch footballer and manager

Deaths

January
 January 5 – Jack Butler (66), English international footballer and manager (born 1894)

October
 October 31 – Alberto Chividini, Argentine defender, runner up of the 1930 FIFA World Cup . (54)

References

 
Association football by year